(), better known as  or , or Mary the Copt, died 637, was an Egyptian woman who, along with her sister Sirin, was sent to the Islamic prophet Muhammad in 628 as a gift by Al-Muqawqis, a Christian governor of Alexandria, during the territory's Persian occupation. She and her sister were slaves. She spent the rest of her life in Medina where she converted to Islam and married Muhammad with whom she had a son, Ibrahim. The son would die as an infant and then she died almost five years later.

Al-Maqrizi says that she was a native of p-Manhabin, a village located near Antinoöpolis.

Biography

In the Islamic year 6 AH (627 – 628 CE), Muhammad is said to have had letters written to the great rulers of the Middle East, proclaiming the continuation of the monotheistic faith with its final messages and inviting the rulers to join. The purported texts of some of the letters are found in Muhammad ibn Jarir al-Tabari's History of the Prophets and Kings. Tabari writes that a deputation was sent to an Egyptian governor named as al-Muqawqis. Maria was a slave who was offered as a gift of goodwill to Muhammad in reply to his envoys inviting the governor of Alexandria to Islam. Muhammad manumitted her after the birth of her son.

Tabari recounts the story of Maria's arrival from Egypt:

The death of Ibrahim caused Muhammad to weep.

Status as a wife or concubine
Like Rayhana bint Zayd, there is some debate between historians and scholars as to whether Maria ever became Muhammad's wife or remained a concubine. An indication that she was a concubine is that when she bore her son to Muhammad, she was set free. 

There is also strong evidence that there was no living quarter for her in the proximity of the Prophet's Mosque. Only the wives of Muhammad had their quarters adjacent to one another in the proximity of his mosque at Medina. Maria was made to reside permanently in an orchard, some three kilometers from the mosque. Evidence that suggests she was a concubine is in the narration:

The ‘female-slave’ referred to in this narration was Maria, the Copt, as specified in a hadith attributed to Umar and classified as sahih by Ibn Kathir, which names her Umm Ibrahim (the mother of Ibrahim).

In a report from Ibn ‘Abbas and ‘Urwah b. al-Zubair concerning the same incident, Muhammad said to Hafsa:

Some Islamic scholars point to a different Asbāb al-nuzūl (circumstance of revelation) for the above incident, saying it was only caused by Muhammad drinking honey, as narrated in Sahih al-Bukhari by Muhammed's wife Aisha:

However, another narration in Sunan Abu Dawud indicates that drinking honey is a euphemism for sexual intercourse:

Al-Tabari lists Maria as both one of Muhammad's wives and his slave, perhaps using "wife" in the sense of one whom Muhammad slept with and who mothered his child.

One hadith attributed to Mus‘ab b. ‘Abdullah al-Zubairi states that the two were married, though another rendering of the hadith by Mus‘ab's nephew Zubair b. al-Bakkar makes no mention of marriage.<ref>{{cite book|quote=My uncle related to me saying: The chief of Alexandria Maquqas sent as gifts to the Messenger of Allah (ﷺ), Maria bt. Sham‘un, the Copt, her sister Shirin, and a eunuch named Mabur. The Messenger of Allah (ﷺ) took Maria bt. Sham‘un for himself. She was the mother of (Prophet’s son) Ibrahim. He gifted Shirin to Hassan b. Thabit|author=Zubair b. al-Bakkar|title=al-Muwaffaqiyat'|publisher=‘Alam al-Kitab|year=1996|volume=147}}</ref>

Due to the lack of clarity and authenticity of traditional reports, it is difficult for one to find out which report is historically authentic. From an academic point of view, to know whether Maria was Muhammad's concubine or wife may not be possible because many western scholars have questioned the historical reliability of traditional reports on various grounds. (see: Criticism of hadith) 

See also
Aisha bint Abu Bakr
List of non-Arab Sahaba

Notes

References
Ibn Ishaq, translate or not. Guillaume (1955). The Life of Muhammad. Oxford University Press.
Tabari (1997). Vol. 8 of the Tarikh al-Rusul wa al-Muluk. State University of New York Press.
Ibn Saad The Sira of Muhammad''.
SeekersHub, Faraz Rabbani

Further reading

637 deaths
Year of birth unknown
Converts to Islam from Christianity
Egyptian Copts
Egyptian former Christians
Former Oriental Orthodox Christians
Women companions of the Prophet
Non-Arab companions of the Prophet
Wives of Muhammad
Arabian slaves and freedmen
Slave concubines